U.S. Fire Arms Manufacturing Company
 United States Fencing Association, the governing body for the sport of fencing in the United States
 United States Fire Administration, a United States government agency
 United States Food Administration
 United States Forces in Austria, in Allied-occupied Austria (1945-1955)
 Union Sportive des Forces Armées et Sécurité de Bamako, a Malian football club
 Union Sportive des Forces Armées Ouagadogou, a Burkinabé football club
 Uttarakhand State Football Association, the governing body for association football in Uttarakhand, India